Liuzhou Forest City is a planned city in Guangxi, People's Republic of China.

Geography 
Liuzhou is located on the banks of the Liu River, at an approximate distance of 255 km (158 mi) from Nanning, the regional capital. Liuzhou Forest City will be built to the north of Liuzhou, in the Nanling Mountains.

History 
Liujiang men, one of the earliest modern human species are found in this region. It has a continuous history of 2,100 years. Nearby city Liuzhou was found in 111 B.C., then it was known as Tanzhong.

China has recorded one of the highest rate of urbanisation, with 14 million inhabitants migrating to cities each year. Forest City is a project initiated in China to fight environmental pollution. The masterplan of the city was uploaded by Liuzhou Municipality Urban Planning in 2017. Construction was initially expected to begin in 2020.

Design 
The concept of this city started right after the success of Vertical Forest in Milan. All the constructions and buildings like offices, houses, hotels, hospitals and schools will be entirely covered by plants and trees to fight atmospheric pollution. The city will host 40,000 trees and almost 1 million plants of 100 different species.

References 

Planned cities in China
Liuzhou